Sandra Douglass Morgan is an American attorney and executive. She is currently the president of the Las Vegas Raiders of the National Football League (NFL). Prior to her tenure with the Raiders, she served on the Nevada State Athletic Commission and was the chairwoman of the Nevada Gaming Control Board among other roles.

Early life
Morgan's father, Gilbert, is a retired US Air Force Veteran. Her mother, Kilcha, is Korean.

Education
Raised in Las Vegas, she graduated from Eldorado High School, earned a bachelor's degree in political science and communication from the University of Nevada, Reno in 1999 before graduating from the University of Nevada, Las Vegas William S. Boyd School of Law with a degree in law in 2003.

Professional life
Once a defense attorney, she later became a litigation attorney for The Mirage from 2005 to 2008, was the city attorney for North Las Vegas from 2008 to 2016 becoming the first African American to hold such a role in Nevada, and director of external affairs for AT&T Services from 2016 to 2019. Later she joined the Nevada State Athletic Commission, the Nevada Gaming Commission and later the Nevada Gaming Control Board in 2019, appointed by Governor  Steve Sisolak, becoming the first African American to serve as chair. During her tenure she introduced reforms - as the proposal to require to gaming companies to establish written policies against harassment and discrimination towards their own employees based on factors such as sex, race, color, gender identity, and national origin - and was responsible for closing and reopening casinos during the COVID-19 pandemic. In this period she also served in the State COVID-19 task force.

After leaving prematurely the control board she joined the board of Caesars Entertainment as well as the boards of Fidelity Investments, Allegiant Airlines, and Cerberus Cyber Sentinel. Morgan joined the law firm of Covington & Burling LLP as counsel in November 2021 and also ran her own consulting service, Douglass Morgan LLC. In December 2021 Morgan was also named vice chair of Las Vegas’ host committee for Super Bowl LVIII, which is scheduled for February 2024.

On July 7, 2022, the Las Vegas Raiders announced Morgan as their new team president. Morgan's hiring made her the first black female team president in the National Football League. She is also the third woman and third African-American in NFL history to become a president of an NFL team.

Personal life
Morgan is married to former Minnesota Vikings and Arizona Cardinals safety Don Morgan. Together, the couple has two children, Dylan and Dana.

References

External links
Personal website bio

1978 births
Place of birth missing (living people)
Living people
American sports executives and administrators
Las Vegas Raiders executives
National Football League team presidents
Nevada lawyers
American women in business
Women in American professional sports management
American women lawyers
Women National Football League executives
21st-century American women
William S. Boyd School of Law alumni
University of Nevada, Reno alumni
American people of Korean descent